= Converging Technologies for Improving Human Performance =

Cover of 2002 report.

"Converging Technologies for Improving Human Performance" (CTIHP) is a 2002 report commissioned by the U.S. National Science Foundation and Department of Commerce. The report contains descriptions and commentaries on the state of the science and technology of the combined fields of nanotechnology, biotechnology, information technology and cognitive science (NBIC) by major contributors to these fields. Potential uses of these technologies in improving health and overcoming disability are discussed in the report, as well as ongoing work on planned applications of human enhancement technologies in the military and in rationalization of the human-machine interface in industrial settings.

== Quotations ==
- "Understanding of the mind and brain will enable the creation of a new species of intelligent machine systems that can generate economic wealth on a scale hitherto unimaginable. Within a half-century, intelligent machines might create the wealth needed to provide food, clothing, shelter, education, medical care, a clean environment, and physical and financial security for the entire world population. Intelligent machines may eventually generate the production capacity to support universal prosperity and financial security for all human beings. Thus, the engineering of the mind is much more than the pursuit of scientific curiosity. It is more even than a monumental technological challenge. It is an opportunity to eradicate poverty and usher in the golden age for all humankind."
- "Technology will increasingly dominate the world, as population, resource exploitation, and potential social conflict grow. Therefore, the success of this convergent technologies priority area is essential to the future of humanity."
